Camellia grijsii is a species of plant in the family Theaceae. It is endemic to China.  It is threatened by habitat loss.

References

grijsii
Endemic flora of China
Vulnerable plants
Taxonomy articles created by Polbot